The WWW Interactive Multipurpose Server (WIMS) (sometimes referred to as WWW Interactive Mathematics Server) project is designed for supporting intensive mathematical exercises via the Internet or in a computer-equipped classroom with server-side interactivity, accessible at the address http://wims.unice.fr.

The system has the following main features:
A modular design allowing applications and software interfaces to be created and maintained independently from each other.
Features interfaces for software including MuPAD, PARI/GP, Gnuplot, POV-Ray, Co.
Dynamic rendering of mathematical formulas and animated graphics.
A structure of virtual classes, including mechanisms for automatic score gathering and processing.

The program is open source and freely available under the GNU General Public Licence, however each WIMS module has its own copyright policy, which may differ from that of the server program.

It is often cited and linked for its sophisticated "online calculator" tools capable of generating animated GIFs of parametric 2D or 3D graphs or allowing prime tests with very large numbers.

Author 
Xiao Gang was a professor at University of Nice Sophia Antipolis. He was interested in solar energy and algebraic geometry. He was also the active site manager of the WIMS of the university he worked for. Xiao Gang died on June 27, 2014.

Xiao Gang taught himself during the Up to the Mountains and Down to the Countryside Movement. He obtained his master's degree from the University of Science and Technology of China. Xiao obtained his Ph.D. degree from University of Paris-Sud in 1984. Xiao Gang returned to China and became a lecturer at East China Normal University. He was promoted to professor in 1986, and was awarded the Shiing-Shen Chern Prize in Mathematics in 1991. In 1992, Xiao became a professor at University of Nice Sophia Antipolis.

External links 
 English WIMS at wims.unice.fr  - The WIMS of the University of Nice Sophia Antipolis in France, the most popular WIMS  for it was the first one and is hosted at the creator's university.
 WIMS at wims.ac-nice.fr - The WIMS of the Académie de Nice - One of the few featuring a redesigned skin.
 English WIMS help 
 List of WIMS Servers/Mirrors at wims.unice.fr
 "WIMS A server for interactive mathematics on the internet" - Paper on WIMS by XIAO, Gang written in 1999
 WIMS download page
 Interface to the Direc exec WIMS module - This gives direct code access to many other WIMS modules (e.g. the POV-Ray renderer or a C compiler).
 A list of frequent citers of unice.fr WIMS modules (some Wikipedia articles)
 List of the online calculators available sorted by popularity.
 WIMS EDU association site.

References 

Servers (computing)